Kindala is an album by the Brazilian musician Margareth Menezes. It was released in 1991. It reached the top 10 on Billboard'''s World Albums chart. Menezes supported the album with an international tour.

Production
The album was produced by Nestor Madrid. Jimmy Cliff sang on "Me Abraça E Me Beija", which he also cowrote. "Fé Cega, Faca Amolada" is a cover of the Milton Nascimento song. "Jet Ski" is a protest song about, among other things, environmental degradation in Brazil.

Critical receptionEntertainment Weekly wrote that the album melds "the rough rhythms of Bahia with modern technology." The Chicago Tribune stated that the "samba-reggae" sound "joins thundering Afro-Brazilian bloco afro percussion with the well-recognized rhythms and social messages of reggae."The Province stated that Kindala adds "reggae and African rhythms to a mighty orchestra of latin percussion." Newsday determined that it "leans most heavily towards a percussive unification of samba's big-bottom strut with reggae's langurous lope."

AllMusic wrote: "In contrast to so much of the softer, more jazz-influenced pop that has come out of Rio de Janeiro, Kindala'' is grittier and notably percussive, yet consistently melodic."

Track listing

References

1991 albums
Mango Records albums